Jesús Antonio Molina Granados (born 29 March 1988) is a Mexican professional footballer who plays as a defensive midfielder for Liga MX club UNAM.

Club career

UANL
Jesús Molina debuted with Tigres UANL on 24 August 2007 in a 1–2 defeat against Veracruz. During the Apertura 2007 tournament he made eight appearances under then-manager Américo Gallego. The following Clausura 2008 tournament, Molina only made one appearance against Pachuca in a 1–6 defeat on 14 February.

Molina scored his first goal for UANL on 10 May 2009 in a 1–1 draw against Monarcas Morelia. During the Clausura 2010 tournament, Molina scored six goals in thirteen appearances.

For the Clausura 2011, his final tournament with UANL, Molina made sixteen appearances and scored one goal.

América
On 8 June 2011 Molina was officially transferred to Club América for the Apertura 2011 tournament. He made his official debut on 24 July 2011 in a 2–1 victory against Querétaro. He then went on to become a champion with América in the Clausura 2013 tournament and in the Apertura 2014 tournament.

Molina scored his first goal for América on 25 February 2012 in a 4–0 victory against Atlante.

Santos Laguna
On 1 January 2015 Molina was officially transferred to Santos Laguna for the Clausura 2015 tournament. He made his official debut on 18 January 2015 in a 0–1 loss against Cruz Azul. He then went to become a champion with Santos Laguna in the Clausura 2015 tournament.

Molina scored his first goal for Santos Laguna on 24 January 2015 in a 4–1 victory against Monterrey.

Monterrey
In December 2016, Molina joined C.F. Monterrey.

Guadalajara
In December 2018, Molina joined C.D. Guadalajara. On 6 January 2019, he made his debut with Guadalajara, as a starter, in a 2–0 victory over Club Tijuana. On 27 October, he scored his first goal with Guadalajara in a 2–1 victory over Juárez.

Shortly after the arrival of Tomás Boy as new manager of the club, in June 2019, Molina was named captain of the team for the upcoming season.

International career
Molina made his debut for Mexico on 17 March 2010 in a friendly match against North Korea, which Mexico won 2–1.

In May 2018, Molina was named in the preliminary 28-man squad for the World Cup, but did not make the final 23.

Career statistics

International

Honours
Tigres UANL
SuperLiga: 2009

América
Liga MX: Clausura 2013, Apertura 2014

Santos Laguna
Liga MX: Clausura 2015
Campeon de Campeones: 2015

Monterrey
Copa MX: Apertura 2017

Individual
Liga MX Best XI: Clausura 2015

References

External links

1988 births
Living people
Sportspeople from Hermosillo
Footballers from Sonora
Tigres UANL footballers
Club América footballers
Santos Laguna footballers
C.F. Monterrey players
Liga MX players
Association football midfielders
Mexico international footballers
2013 FIFA Confederations Cup players
Copa América Centenario players
2017 CONCACAF Gold Cup players
Mexican footballers